Corus cretaceus is a species of beetle in the family Cerambycidae. It was described by Louis Alexandre Auguste Chevrolat in 1858.

References

cretaceus
Beetles described in 1858